The London and North Eastern Railway (LNER) J94 Class is a class of steam locomotive that was formed when 75 former "Austerity" 0-6-0STs were purchased by the LNER in 1946 from the War Department.


Overview 
The LNER had had trials with one in November 1945 and bought 75 of them in 1946, numbering them 8006-80.  All entered British Railways (BR) service in 1948.  BR added 60000 to their numbers so they became 68006-80, and classified them 4F.

They were used for shunting in docks, and other similar work where their short wheelbase meant they could negotiate sharp curves.  They were used on the Cromford and High Peak Railway in Derbyshire, where they displaced the ex-North London Railway Class 75 class 2F s.

They were withdrawn between 1960 and 1967.  A few were sold into industrial use with the National Coal Board (who had several other Austerities) and others.

Stock list

Preservation 

Two, BR Nos 68077 and 68078 and have been preserved. In addition a large number of Austerities that were used in industry and have survived to preservation.  Several of these have been disguised as BR locomotives. . Enthusiasts often refer to them by the nickname of "Buckets".

LNER/BR J94s

Locomotives disguised as J94s

Models 
The erstwhile Rosebud Kitmaster company produced an unpowered polystyrene injection moulded model kit for 00 gauge, which went on sale in Spring 1961. In early 1963, the Kitmaster brand was sold by its parent company (Rosebud Dolls) to Airfix, who transferred the moulding tools to their own factory; they re-introduced some of the former Kitmaster range, including this locomotive. The tool (for this model) was destroyed in a fire at the premises of Dapol Model Railways Ltd in Winsford, Cheshire so that Dapol were unable to produce further kits after their first two production runs totalling 4000 kits after acquisition of the former Airfix moulds.

References 

 
  (Introduction by Don Townsley)

External links 

 The Riddles J94 (WD Austerity) 0-6-0ST Locomotives LNER Encyclopedia
 Class J94 Details at Rail UK

J94
0-6-0ST locomotives
Railway locomotives introduced in 1946
Standard gauge steam locomotives of Great Britain
Shunting locomotives